The 2018–19 Idaho State Bengals women's basketball team represents Idaho State University during the 2018–19 NCAA Division I women's basketball season. The Bengals, led by eleventh year head coach Seton Sobolewski, play their home games at Reed Gym. They were members of the Big Sky Conference. They finished the season 20–11, 15–5 in Big Sky play to finish in a tie for second place. They lost in the semifinals of the Big Sky women's tournament to Eastern Washington. They received an at-large bid to the WNIT where they lost to Arizona in the first round.

Roster

Schedule

|-
!colspan=9 style=| Exhibition

|-
!colspan=9 style=| Non-conference regular season

|-
!colspan=9 style=| Big Sky regular season

|-
!colspan=9 style=| Big Sky Women's Tournament

|-
!colspan=9 style=| WNIT

See also
 2018–19 Idaho State Bengals men's basketball team

References

Idaho State Bengals women's basketball seasons
Idaho State
Idaho State